The Dhauladhar Express is an Express train belonging to Northern Railway zone that runs between  and  in India. It is currently being operated with 14035/14036 train numbers on tri-weekly basis.

Service

The 14035/Dhauladhar Express has an average speed of 52 km/hr and covers 496 km in 9h 35m. The 14036/Dhauladhar Express has an average speed of 45 km/hr and covers 496 km in 11h 5m.

Route and halts 

The important halts of the train are:

 
 
 
Bahadurgarh

Coach composition

The train has standard ICF rakes with maximum speed of 110 kmph. The train consists of 20 coaches:

 1 First AC cum AC-2 Tier
 1 AC-2 cum AC-3 Tier
 3 AC-3 Tier
 9 Sleeper
 4 General Unreserved
 2 Seating cum Luggage Rake

Traction

Both trains are hauled by a Tuglakabad Loco Shed-based WDP-4B diesel locomotive from Delhi Sarai Rohilla to Pathankot and vice versa.

See also 

 Old Delhi railway station
 Pathankot Junction railway station
 Delhi–Pathankot Superfast Express

Notes

References

External links 

 14035/Dhauladhar Express
 14036/Dhauladhar Express

Transport in Delhi
Transport in Pathankot
Named passenger trains of India
Rail transport in Delhi
Rail transport in Haryana
Rail transport in Punjab, India
Express trains in India